Bernardino de Villalpando, C.R.S.A. (died August 1569) was a Roman Catholic prelate who served as Bishop of Santiago de Guatemala (1564–1569)
and Bishop of Santiago de Cuba (1561–1564).

Biography
Bernardino de Villalpando was born in Talavera de la Reina, Spain and ordained a priest in the Canons Regular of St. Augustine. 
On 27 June 1561, he was appointed during the papacy of Pope Pius IV as Bishop of Santiago de Cuba and consecrated bishop in 1562. 
On 28 April 1564, he was appointed during the papacy of Pope Pius IV as Bishop of Santiago de Guatemala where he served until his death in August 1569.

References

External links and additional sources
 (for Chronology of Bishops)  
 (for Chronology of Bishops) 
 (for Chronology of Bishops) 
 (for Chronology of Bishops) 

16th-century Roman Catholic bishops in Cuba
Bishops appointed by Pope Pius IV
1569 deaths
16th-century Roman Catholic bishops in Guatemala
Roman Catholic bishops of Guatemala (pre-1743)
Roman Catholic bishops of Santiago de Cuba